Kusakabe (written: 草壁 or 日下部) is a Japanese surname. Notable people with the surname include:

, prince of Japan
, Japanese judoka
, 19th-century Japanese photographer

Fictional characters
, a character in Kamikaze Kaito Jeanne
, a character in the manga series Lucky Star
, a character in 11eyes
, protagonist of the manga series Fire Force

See also
, Japanese clan

Japanese-language surnames